Hollywood / I Am the Resurrection is the second single release by Scottish alternative rock band Codeine Velvet Club from their 2009 debut album Codeine Velvet Club. It is a double A-Side with their cover of The Stone Roses' "I Am the Resurrection". The song was released on 28 December 2009, the same day as their debut album. "I Am the Resurrection" went on to be added as a bonus track on the band's debut album.

Promotion

To promote the track, Codeine Velvet Club posted a video of the band performing the song in the studio on September 6, 2009 along with various of tracks from the album. An official video has been released and can be viewed on their website or the Island Records Channel on YouTube. It depicts the band performing "Hollywood" to an empty hall, with the exception of the woman from the album and single covers watching. The band opened each gig of their 2009 UK tour with this song.

Track listing

Artwork

The single's artwork continues the theme found on the album's cover and the previous single's ("Vanity Kills") cover. Depicting a woman in raincoat and sunglasses. The artwork also resembles the artwork of The Stone Roses' artwork for their I Am the Resurrection single.

References

2009 singles
2009 songs
Island Records singles